|}

References 

1832 elections in the United Kingdom